WVFJ-FM (93.3 MHz, "The JOY FM") is a Christian radio station that serves western central Georgia, including portions of Metro Atlanta and the Columbus-Auburn-Opelika area.  Its city of license is Greenville, Georgia. The WVFJ studio is located in Tyrone, Georgia. It broadcasts a Contemporary Christian format.

History
The station was originally known as WFDR-FM, the sister station to WFDR AM 1370, which still shares Manchester as its city of license.  The stations' broadcast callsign is a reference to former U.S. President Franklin D. Roosevelt, who had his Little White House vacation home in nearby Warm Springs, Georgia.  The callsign was issued on the first day of December 1978.  On the last day of October 1981 it became WQCK, and two years later adopted its current callsign on July 7.

On February 13, 1981, Atlanta businessman Bill Watkins and his wife Joyce founded Provident Broadcasting Company in order to create a broadcast ministry for the benefit of Christian believers and those seeking spiritual inspiration.  WVFJ, then called "The Joy FM", was their first station in this new ministry.  In 1998, J93.3 moved its radio studios from the small community of Manchester, Georgia into Atlanta market as metro Atlanta's first contemporary-Christian radio station. The transmitter was moved to just outside Greenville, Georgia.

The station was owned and operated by Provident Broadcasting Company, a wholly-owned subsidiary of Watkins Associated Industries, Incorporated.  Their stated mission is to provide wholesome family programming filled with joy, hope, and encouragement.

In March 2011, WVFJ became officially owned by Radio Training Network.  One of the changes under new ownership is that after 30 years, WVFJ is now-listener supported instead of advertiser supported.  In May, WVFJ is expected to add 11,000 watts to its power and be officially a noncommercial station.  Through HD radio and broadcast translators, WVFJ is planning to make other improvements to their signal in the Atlanta media market, although the power increase actually adds a minimal amount of broadcast range.

The station is currently retransmitted on W270AS 101.9 in Carrollton to the northwest and W231AO 94.1 in Columbus to the southwest, all located southwest of Atlanta in western Georgia.  It is also listed as the primary station for 120 other translator applications filed by Edgewater Broadcasting in 2003, in what was called the "Great Translator Invasion".  All of these are in western Georgia and eastern Alabama.

On December 1, 2011, J93 became The JOY FM.   For the 2011 holidays, it was broadcasting all Christmas music, competing with Christian station WFSH-FM 104.7, and secular WSB-FM 98.5, both from Atlanta.

A new CP to help them improve their signal in Atlanta is shown on the FCC database.  Once built, WVFJ will broadcast with 57,000 watts of power.  To learn more about it visit: https://fccdata.org/?facid=53679

On January 12, 2023, WVFJ's transmitter tower was destroyed by a tornado.

Repeaters

Translators

Contemporary Christian music

Christian worship

Christian hip hop

See also
 WMSL — 88.9 FM, licensed to Bogart, Georgia

References

External links

VFJ-FM
Contemporary Christian radio stations in the United States
Radio stations established in 1981
VFJ